DreamWorks Theatre is a motion simulator attraction at Universal Studios Hollywood that opened on June 15, 2018, in the Universal City area of Los Angeles, California. The attraction is themed around characters featured in films from DreamWorks Animation and features the use of projection mapping. It replaced the Shrek 4-D attraction, which closed on August 13, 2017.

Background 
Following NBCUniversal's purchase of DreamWorks Animation for $3.8 billion in 2016, the company sought to leverage its newly acquired intellectual properties. On June 5, 2017, Universal Studios Hollywood announced the new DreamWorks Theatre attraction, which would open in 2018 and be based on characters featured in DreamWorks Animation films. The attraction replaced the Shrek 4-D attraction on August 13.

The attraction's pre-show features a variety of DreamWorks characters, including Shrek, Donkey, Gingy, and the Magic Mirror from Shrek, as well as Poppy from Trolls, and Marty and the Penguins from Madagascar. Even DreamWorks' mascot, the Moon Child, plays a role in the pre-show, opening the auditorium doors by swinging his fishing rod after being asked to do so by Po.

The theatre uses projection mapping on the interior walls, with a total of seven Christie 4K Boxer Cinema Projectors, surround sound audio, and physical effects such as water, wind, and articulating seats.

Kung Fu Panda: The Emperor’s Quest 
The first attraction to show in the venue was Kung Fu Panda: The Emperor’s Quest, which is based on the Kung Fu Panda franchise. It takes place on the morning of the Emperor's Great Feast of Heroes, where dragon warrior Po the Panda along with Master Shifu and Mr. Ping embark on a quest to deliver the Liquid of Limitless Power to the Emperor. It includes "raging rapids, river wolf pirates, awesome magic and, obviously, Kung Fu." The film was developed in collaboration with DreamWorks, and it featured the original voice cast from Kung Fu Panda (except Dustin Hoffman, who is replaced by Fred Tatasciore as Shifu).

The attraction opened on June 15, 2018.

Cast 
 Mick Wingert as Po
 Fred Tatasciore as Master Shifu
 James Hong as Mr. Ping
 Michael Gough as Shrek
 Mark Moseley as Donkey
 Phil LaMarr as Marty
 Anna Kendrick as Poppy
 Conrad Vernon as Gingerbread Man / Rico
 Tom McGrath as Skipper
 Chris Miller as Magic Mirror

References

Universal Studios Hollywood
Universal Pictures animated films
Universal Parks & Resorts attractions by name
Universal Parks & Resorts films
2018 animated films
2010s American animated films
2010s animated short films
4D films
2018 in film
Kung Fu Panda
Madagascar (franchise)
DreamWorks Animation in amusement parks
Amusement park attractions based on film franchises
2018 establishments in California